Tam Nông is a rural district (huyện) of Đồng Tháp province in the Mekong Delta region of Vietnam. As of 2003 the district had a population of 96,641. The district covers an area of 459 km2. The district capital lies at Tràm Chim.

There is a bird sanctuary – Tràm Chim National Park – where red-headed crane (scientific name: Grus antigone sharpei) migrates to every spring. The most ideal living environment for this bird is the spikesedge field which is its diet.

Divisions
The district is divided into one urban ward and communes:
Tràm Chim
An Hòa
An Long
Phú Ninh
Phú Thành A
Phú Thành B
Phú Thọ
Phú Hiệp
Phú Đức
Phú Cường
Tân Công Sính
Hòa Bình

References

Districts of Đồng Tháp province